"On the Prowl" is a song written by Jimmy Manzie and recorded by Australian band Ol' 55. The song was released in May 1976 as the lead single from the band's debut studio album, Take It Greasy (1976). The song peaked at number 14 on the Australian Kent Music Report, becoming the band's first top 50 single.

Track listing
7" (K-6587)
Side A	"On the Prowl" – 2:59
Side B "This Little Girl" – 2:39

Charts

Weekly charts

Year-end charts

References

1976 songs
1976 singles
Ol' 55 (band) songs
Songs written by Jimmy Manzie
Mushroom Records singles